NPT may refer to:

Codes 
Newport State Airport, Middletown, Rhode Island, US, IATA code

Law 
 Nuclear Non-Proliferation Treaty, since 1970
 Neighbourhood Policing Team, UK

Organizations 
 National Philanthropic Trust, offering donor-advised funds

Places 
 Northville-Placid Trail, New York, US

Technology 
 National pipe thread, US standards
 Nested Page Tables, later Rapid Virtualization Indexing, an AMD technology
 Nissan NPT-90, a racing car
 Non-pneumatic tire or airless tire
 IPv6-to-IPv6 Network Prefix Translation (NPTv6)

Miscellaneous 
 Nepal Standard Time
 NpT ensemble or isothermal–isobaric ensemble
Near Patient Testing. Clinical patient testing done in Primary care, under a shared care agreement with secondary care. eg Rheumatology